The Texas Tech Red Raiders baseball team represents Texas Tech University in  NCAA Division I college baseball. The team competes in the Big 12 Conference and plays at Dan Law Field at Rip Griffin Park. Their head coach is Tim Tadlock and is entertaining his 9th season with the Red Raiders.

History

Early years

Along with the football and men's basketball teams, the Texas Tech baseball team was founded during the university's initial academic year, in 1925–26. The team's first series was against the West Texas A&M Buffaloes in 1926, an 18–9 victory in the first game and 14–9 loss in the second. The third game in the team's history—this one against Daniel Baker College—ended in a 3–3 tie after 11 innings.

E. Y. Freeland was the first coach of the Red Raiders, though the team was known as the Matadors at the time. He remained in the position for three years before R. Grady Higginbotham took the role. Higginbotham coached for only two years. From 1930 to 1953, Texas Tech did not field an intercollegiate baseball team.

Revival era
When the program returned in 1954, Beattie Feathers became the head coach of the Red Raiders and remained until 1960. He was followed by Berl Huffman (1961–1967), Kal Segrist (1968–1983), and Gary Ashby (1984–1986).  Texas Tech joined the Southwest Conference in 1968, but experienced little success.  During this 26 season period, the Red Raiders had only seven winning seasons; only twice finishing as high as third, with only three winning records in conference play.

Modern era
Larry Hays took over the Red Raiders baseball team in 1987. Under Hays, Texas Tech endured only two losing seasons, his first and last, and enjoyed their greatest success in baseball. Hays took Texas Tech from having a losing tradition to being a national contender. When Hays started with the Red Raiders, the team's overall record stood at 550–576–5. By the time he left, he was the fourth-winningest coach in college baseball history and improved the team's record to 1,365–1,054–8. The Red Raiders reached eight straight NCAA tournaments from 1995 to 2002 and again in 2004, three of which were held at Dan Law Field at Rip Griffin Park. They also won the 1995 Southwest Conference championship, and the inaugural Big 12 Conference championship in 1997. The Hays-led Red Raiders also won the SWC Tournament in 1995, and the Big 12 Tournament in 1998.

On June 2, 2008, Larry Hays announced his retirement, paving the way for assistant coach Dan Spencer to take over. Spencer, a former Texas Tech player, won back-to-back national championships as an assistant head coach for the Oregon State Beavers. In Spencer's four seasons as head coach, he led the Red Raiders to only one winning season. Prior to Spencer's fourth, and final, season as head coach, Tim Tadlock was hired as associate head coach for the Red Raiders under Dan Spencer. The following season saw Tadlock replace Spencer as the ninth head coach of the Red Raiders following Spencer's firing.

Tadlock was a starting shortstop for the Red Raiders during the 1990 and 1991 seasons. Tadlock previously led the Grayson College Vikings to back-to-back NJCAA Division I World Series championships in the team's five appearances over his 9 seasons as head coach. Tadlock's first season saw the team finish 26–30, and 8th of 9 in Big 12 play. Prior to the 2014 season, the Red Raiders were selected to finish in 8th place in the Big 12 Conference in the preseason polls. In only his second season, the Red Raiders won their first NCAA Tournament Regional Championship, defeating the Columbia Lions and host team Miami Hurricanes to advance to the program's first Super Regional appearance. The team would host College of Charleston in the Lubbock Super Regional before shutting them out twice in two 1–0 games, earning the programs first berth in the College World Series on the back of a 0.65 post season earned run average produced by assistant coach Ray Hayward's pitching staff. The Red Raiders have since gone on to win Big 12 regular season conference championships in 2016, 2017 and 2019 and again host both Regional and Super Regional rounds of the NCAA Tournament in Lubbock while also making three more appearances in the College World Series (2016, 2018-2019).

Ballpark

Season-by-season results

Source:

Head coaches

Individual accomplishments
Unanimous All-American
Jace Jung (2021)
Josh Jung  (2019)
Steven Gingery  (2017)
National Pitcher of the Year Award
Steven Gingery  (2017)
Big 12 Conference Player of the Year
Jace Jung (2021)
Josh Jung (2019)
Hunter Hargrove (2017)
Eric Gutierrez (2016)
Joe Dillon (1997)
Big 12 Conference Pitcher of the Year
Brandon Birdsell (2022)
Steven Gingery  (2017)
Big 12 Conference Freshman of the Year
Hudson White (2022)
Gabe Holt (2018)
Josh Jung  (2017)
Big 12 Conference Coach of the Year
Tim Tadlock  (2016)
Larry Hays  (1997)
Big 12 Conference Tournament MVP
Josh Bard  (1998)
Southwest Conference Coach of the Year
Larry Hays (1995)
Southwest Conference Tournament MVP
Jason Tolman (1995)
NCAA Division I Regional Tournament MVP
Kurt Wilson (2021, Lubbock)
Cam Warren (2019, Lubbock)
Zach Rheams (2018, Lubbock)
Hayden Howard (2016, Lubbock)
Dylan Dusek (2014, Coral Gables)
Skip Bertman Award
Tim Tadlock (2014)

Retired jerseys

Red Raiders in the Major Leagues

At least 30 former Texas Tech Red Raiders have gone on to play Major League Baseball.

{| class="wikitable"
!Player
!MLB Career Dates
!Round Drafted
!Team Drafted
|-
|Chuck Harrison
|1965-1969, 1971
|N/A
|N/A
|-
|Doug Ault 
|1976-1980
|Free Agent
|Texas Rangers
|-
|Donald Harris
|1991-1993
|1st (5th pick) 
|Texas Rangers
|-
|Mike Humphreys
|1991-1993
|15th
|San Diego Padres
|-
|Mark Brandenburg
|1995-1997
|26th
|Texas Rangers
|-
|Ryan Nye
|1997-1998
|2nd
|Philadelphia Phillies
|-
|Travis Smith
|1998-2006
|19th
|Milwaukee Brewers
|-
|Brandon Kolb
|2000-2001
|38th
|Oakland Athletics
|-
|Keith Ginter
|2000-2005
|10th
|Houston Astros
|-
|Stubby Clapp
|2001
2019–present (Coach) 
|36th
|St. Louis Cardinals
|-
|Matt Miller
|2001-2002
|2nd
|Detroit Tigers
|-
|Trey Lunsford
|2002-2003
|33rd
|San Francisco Giants
|-
|Travis Driskill
|2002-2005, 2007
|4th
|Cleveland Indians
|-
|Josh Bard
|2002-2011
2016–present (Coach) 
|3rd
|Colorado Rockies
|-
|Steve Watkins
|2004
|16th
|San Diego Padres
|-
|Joe Dillon
|2005, 2007-2009
2018–present (Coach)
|7th
|Kansas City Royals
|-
|Chris Sampson 
|2006-2009
|8th
|Houston Astros
|-
|Jeff Karstens
|2006-2012
|19th
|New York Yankees
|-
|Dallas Braden
|2007-2011
|24th
|Oakland Athletics
|-
|Dustin Richardson
|2009-2010
|5th
|Boston Red Sox
|-
|Josh Tomlin
|2010-present
|19th
|Cleveland Indians
|-
|Zach Stewart
|2011–2012
|3rd
|Cincinnati Reds
|-
|AJ Ramos
|2012-2018, 2020-2021
|21st
|Florida Marlins
|-
|Roger Kieschnick
|2013-2014
|3rd
|San Francisco Giants
|-
|Nathan Karns
|2013-2017, 2019
|12th
|Washington Nationals
|-
|Chad Bettis
|2013-2019
|2nd
|Colorado Rockies
|-
|Danny Coulombe
|2014-2018, 2020-present
|25th
|Los Angeles Dodgers
|-
|Kelby Tomlinson
|2015-2018
|12th
|San Francisco Giants
|-
|Robert Dugger
|2019-present
|18th
|Seattle Mariners
|-
|Parker Mushinski
|2022-present
|7th
|Houston Astros
|-
|Davis Martin
|2022-present
|14th
|Chicago White Sox
|-
|Caleb Kilian
|2022-present
|77th
|San Francisco Giants
|-
|Josh Jung
|2022-present
|1st
|Texas Rangers
|}

Pro Red Raiders in other sports

See also
List of NCAA Division I baseball programs
Brooks Wallace Award
List of college baseball awards

References

External links